In the English language, terms for types of killing often end in the suffix -cide.

Killing of self
 Suicide, intentionally causing one's own death
 Altruistic suicide, suicide for the benefit of others
 Autocide, suicide by automobile
 Medicide, a suicide accomplished with the aid of a physician
 Murder-suicide, a suicide committed immediately after one or more murders
 Self-immolation, suicide by fire, often as a form of protest
 Suicide by cop, acting in a threatening manner so as to provoke a lethal response from law

Killing of other people

All of these are considered types of homicide.

Killing of family
 Avunculicide – the act of killing an uncle ( "(maternal) uncle").
 Familicide – is a multiple-victim homicide where a killer's spouse and children are slain ( "family").
 Filicide – the act of a parent killing their child ( "son" and  "daughter").
 Fratricide – the act of killing a brother ( "brother"); also, in military context, death by friendly fire.
 Geronticide – the abandonment of the elderly to die, die by suicide or be killed.
 Honour killing – the act of murdering a family member perceived to have brought disgrace to the family.
 Infanticide – the act of killing a child within the first year of its life.
 Mariticide – the act of killing one's husband ( “husband”).
 Matricide – the act of killing one's mother ( "mother").
 Neonaticide – the act of killing an infant within the first twenty-four hours or month (varies by individual and jurisdiction) of its life.
 Nepoticide – the act of killing one's nephew.
 Parricide or parenticide – the killing of one's mother, father, or other close relative.
 Patricide – the act of killing of one's father ( "father").
 Prolicide – the act of killing one's own children.
 Senicide – the killing of one's elderly family members when they can no longer work or they have become a burden ( "old man").
 Siblicide – the killing of an infant individual by their close relatives (full or half siblings).
 Sororicide – the act of killing one's sister ( "sister").
 Uxoricide – the act of killing one's wife ( "wife").

Killing of others

 Amicicide – the act of killing a friend ( "friend")
 Androcide – the systematic killing of men.
 Assassination – the act of killing a prominent person for either political, religious, or monetary reasons.
 Capital punishment – the judicial killing of a human being for crimes.
 Casualty – death (or injury) in wartime.
 Collateral damage – deaths during wartime due to imprecise or incorrect targeting or friendly fire.
 Democide or populicide – the murder of any person or people by a government.
 Eugenics – killing a portions of a population assessed to be inferior with the goal of improving the quality of the population as a whole
 Extrajudicial killing – killing by government forces without due process. See also Targeted killing.
 Euthanasia or mercy killing – the killing of any being with compassionate reasoning; e.g., significant injury or disease.
 Familiaricide in commutatione eius possessio – the act of killing a family for their property and/or possessions (from  "of a household";  "in exchange for"; and  "a possession or property").
 Femicide, gynecide, gynaecide, or gynocide – the systematic killing of women.
 Feticide – the act of killing a fetus.
 Fragging - the act of killing a fellow soldier.
 Gendercide – the systematic killing of members of a specific sex or gender.
 Genocide – the systematic extermination of an entire national, racial, religious, or ethnic group.
 Homicide – the act of killing of a person ( "man").
 Justifiable homicide – a defense to culpable homicide (criminal or negligent homicide)
 Human sacrifice – the killing of a human for sacrificial, often religious, reasons.
 Massacre, mass murder or Spree killing – the killing of many people.
 Murder – the malicious and unlawful killing of a human by another human.
 Manslaughter – murder, but under legally mitigating circumstances.
 Omnicide – the act of killing all humans, to create intentional extinction of the human species ( "all, everyone").
 Pedicide – the act of killing a child.
 Senicide or geronticide –  the act of killing an elderly person
 Targeted killing – a form of assassination which is carried out by governments against their perceived enemies. See also Extrajudicial killing.
 Xenocide – the genocide of an entire alien species. Often used in science fiction, one famous example being the novel Xenocide by Orson Scott Card.

Killing of superiors
 Deicide – killing a god, divine being, or deity.
 Regicide – killing a ruler, a King/Queen ( gen.  "king").
 Tyrannicide – killing a tyrant.
 Papicide - killing of a pope. (Ancient Greek: πάππας (páppas) "father")

Killing of animals, disease, and pests
 Algaecide – a chemical agent that kills algae
 Acaricide – a chemical agent that kills mites
 Avicide – a chemical agent that kills birds
 Bactericide – a chemical agent that kills bacteria.
 Biocide – a chemical agent that kills a broad spectrum of living organisms.
 Fungicide – chemical agents or biological organisms used to kill or inhibit fungi or fungal spores.
 Germicide – an agent that kills germs, especially pathogenic microorganisms; a disinfectant
 Herbicide – an agent that kills unwanted plants, a weed killer.
 Insecticide – an agent that kills unwanted insects.
 Larvicide (also larvacide) – an insecticide targeted against the larval life stage of an insect.
 Microbicide – an agent used to kill or reduce the infectiousness of microorganisms.
 Miticide – a chemical to kill mites.
 Nemacide (also nematicide, nematocide) – a chemical to eradicate or kill nematodes.
 Parasiticide – a general term to describe an agent used to destroy parasites.
 Pediculicide – an agent that kills head lice.
 Pesticide – a general term to describe an agent used to destroy or repel a pest.
 Rodenticide - an agent that kills rodents (especially  rats and mice).
 Scabicide – a chemical agent for killing scabies.
 Spermicide – a contraceptive agent to render sperm inert and prevent fertilization.
 Teniacide (also taeniacide, tenicide) – a chemical agent that kills tape worms.
 Theriocide – the act of killing sentient animals, especially mammals (Ancient Greek: therion "wild animal, beast")
 Vermicide – an agent used to kill parasitic intestinal worms.
 Virucide (also viricide) – an agent capable of destroying or inhibiting viruses.
 Vulpicide (also vulpecide) – the killing of a fox by methods other than by hunting it with hounds.

Killing of intangibles or inanimates
 Ecocide – the destruction of the natural environment by such activity as war, overexploitation of resources, or pollution
 Famacide, defamation, or slander – the killing of another's reputation
 Linguicide – intentionally causing the death of a language
 Epistemicide – the systematic extermination of an entire knowledge system or intellectual heritage of a group, society or people.
 Mundicide – the destruction of a planet
 Urbicide – the destruction of a city or the stifling of urbanisation (urbs is Latin for "city")

See also
 Letting die
 Manner of death, a classification made after autopsy

References

External links

Types